The Bank Dick, released as The Bank Detective in the United Kingdom, is a 1940 American comedy film starring W. C. Fields. Set in Lompoc, California, Fields plays Egbert Sousé, a drunk who accidentally thwarts a bank robbery and ends up a bank security guard as a result.

The film was written by Fields, using the alias Mahatma Kane Jeeves (derived from the Broadway drawing-room comedy cliché "My hat, my cane, Jeeves!"), and directed by Edward F. Cline. The film also stars Una Merkel, Richard Purcell, Shemp Howard (of the Three Stooges), Franklin Pangborn, Grady Sutton, Jessie Ralph and Cora Witherspoon.

In 1992, The Bank Dick was selected for preservation in the United States National Film Registry by the Library of Congress as being "culturally, historically, or aesthetically significant."

Plot
Hard-drinking family man Egbert Sousé has strained relations with his wife and mother-in-law over his drinking, smoking and habit of taking money out of the piggy bank of his younger daughter Elsie Mae and replacing it with IOUs. He tries to hit Elsie Mae with a concrete urn but is interrupted when his older daughter Myrtle wants to introduce him to her fiancé Og Oggilby.

When A. Pismo Clam, the director of a film that is shooting in town, goes on a bender, producer Mackley Q. Greene offers the job to Sousé. While on his lunch break, he catches a man who has robbed the bank where Og works. The grateful bank president offers Sousé a job as the bank's "special officer," a bank detective ("dick").

After being conned by swindler J. Frothingham Waterbury, Sousé convinces Og to steal $500 from the bank to invest in a questionable  mining company. Og hopes to return the money to the bank four days later when he expects to receive his annual bonus, but bank examiner J. Pinkerton Snoopington arrives to immediately audit the bank. Sousé invites him to the Black Pussy Cat Café, a saloon run by Joe Guelpe, and drugs him with knockout drops and has him examined by the quack Dr. Stall. Despite this, Snoopington is determined to do his duty and proceed with the audit. Og faints when he sees the examiner in the bank, and Sousé tries to delay the audit further by depriving Snoopington of his glasses.

As Snoopington is about to discover the missing funds, the swindler shows up to buy back the stocks from Og at a discount, but Sousé learns that the mine has struck it rich, and he and Og are now wealthy and no longer must worry about the audit. However, the escaped bank robber Repulsive Brogan returns to rob the bank a second time, and escapes with the bank's money and Og's mining-company stock, taking Sousé hostage. The robber forces him to drive the getaway car, and the police, the bank director, Og and the movie producer chase them, with parts of the getaway car continuously breaking loose. Sousé once again receives the credit for catching the thief and receives $5,000 for the capture of Brogan, $10,000 from the film producer for his screen story and a contract to direct a film based on it.

Now that he is rich, Sousé lives in a mansion and his family is elegant and well-spoken and treats him with respect, but he still follows Joe Guelpe on his way to open the Black Pussy Cat Café.

Cast

Production
Alternative titles for the film were The Bank Detective and The Great Man. With the success of his two previous films, You Can't Cheat an Honest Man and My Little Chickadee, Fields was able to demand complete creative control. He wrote the script under the pseudonym of Mahatma Kane Jeeves. Principal photography began in early September 1940.

Reception

The Bank Dick received many favorable reviews. Bosley Crowther of The New York Times wrote that "for anyone who simply likes to laugh at the reckless inanities of an inspired buffoon, we recommend The Bank Dick. It's great fun." A reviewer for Variety wrote: "It's a crazy-quilt pattern aiming for laughs, and achieves the purpose adequately. Several times, Fields reaches into satirical pantomime reminiscent of Charlie Chaplin's best effort in that line during Mutual and Essanay days."

Harrison's Reports called the film "[a] good program comedy. W.C. Fields is at his best and for that reason the picture should go over very well with his fans." John Mosher of The New Yorker wrote that "there is often an incident or gesture reminiscent of the Mack Sennett comedies. At times, the movie even smacks of those old days so exactly that you almost believe it must be a revival of some classic. There's nothing antiquated about it, however, no stale, museum starchiness, and the scandalous Mr. Fields has to be forgiven his outrageous behavior, since he is so simply and honestly funny." Film critic Leslie Halliwell deemed the film "[i]mperfect, but probably the best Fields vehicle there is" and W.C. Fields biographer Robert Lewis Taylor called it "[o]ne of the great classics of American comedy."

However, Otis Ferguson, a reviewer for The New Republic, wrote: "When [Fields] is funny he is terrific...but the story is makeshift, the other characters are stock types, the only pace discernible is the distance between drinks or the rhythm of the fleeting seconds it takes Fields to size up trouble and duck the hell out."

The film has a rating of 100% on Rotten Tomatoes based on 21 reviews. In a list submitted to Cinema magazine in 1963, noted director Stanley Kubrick named it his eighth-favorite film.

The film was released on DVD by The Criterion Collection but has since been out of print.

References
Informational notes

Citations

External links

 The Bank Dick essay by Randy Skretvedt at National Film Registry 
 The Bank Dick essay by Daniel Eagan in America's Film Legacy: The Authoritative Guide to the Landmark Movies in the National Film Registry, A&C Black, 2010 , pages 327-328 
 
 
 
 
 Review of The Bank Dick  at TVGuide.com
 The Bank Dick an essay by Dennis Perrin at the Criterion Collection
 Roger Ebert "Great Movies" essay on the film 

1940 films
1940s crime comedy films
American crime comedy films
American black-and-white films
Films about bank robbery
Films directed by Edward F. Cline
Films with screenplays by W. C. Fields
United States National Film Registry films
Universal Pictures films
1940 comedy films
1940s English-language films
1940s American films